'Na Starém bělidle' (At the old bleachery) is a 1901 Czech-language opera in 4 scenes by Karel Kovařovic to a libretto by Karel Šípek after Božena Němcová. The opera was premiered 22 November 1901 at Prague National Theatre.

Recordings
 Marta Krásová, Borek Rujan, Vera Krilová, Karel Kalas, Prague Radio Symphony Orchestra, František Dyk 1948

References

1901 operas
Operas by Karel Kovařovic